Matteo dal Nasaro Veronese (died c. 1548), also known as Matteo dal Nasaro of Verona, was an Italian sculptor.

He was born in Verona, Italy, but came to prominence in Paris.  According to Giorgio Vasari in his Lives of the Most Excellent Painters, Sculptors, and Architects, Matteo dal Nasaro excelled in the production of portrait cameos.

References 
 Burns, Howard, Marco Collareta and Davide Gasparotto, Valerio Belli Vicentino, 1468 c.-1546, Vicenza, Italy, Neri Pozza, 2000.
 Vasari, Giorgio, Le Vite delle più eccellenti pittori, scultori, ed architettori, many editions and translations.

Italian sculptors
Italian male sculptors
1540s deaths
Year of birth unknown